Juan Francisco Estrada Romero (born April 14, 1990) is a Mexican professional boxer. He is a two-weight world champion, having held the WBC super flyweight title since 2022 and The Ring super flyweight title since 2019. He previously held the WBA (Unified) and WBO flyweight titles between 2012 and 2015, and the WBC super flyweight title in March 2021 and the WBA (Super) title from March 2021 to August 2022. He also challenged once for the WBA light flyweight title in 2012. As of January 2021, Estrada is ranked as the world's ninth best active boxer, pound for pound, by the Transnational Boxing Rankings Board (TBRB), seventh by The Ring, and tenth by Boxing Writers Association of America (BWAA) . He is also ranked as the world's best active super flyweight by The Ring and the TBRB and BoxRec.

Early life and amateur career
Estrada lost his parents at the age of 7. He was raised by his aunt, and picked up boxing when he was 9. At the age of 15, Estrada moved from his native Puerto Peñasco to Hermosillo to focus on his boxing career. As an amateur, Estrada compiled a 94–4 record.

Professional career

Early career
Estrada made his professional debut on August 30, 2008, at the age of 18. Estrada won his first regional belt 2 years later, in October 2010. He defeated Manuel Almendariz by TKO for the WBC Mundo Hispano super flyweight belt. Estrada suffered his first loss against Juan Carlos Sánchez, Jr. in May 2011. Sánchez stands at 5 ft 8, giving him a significant size advantage over most flyweights. Estrada traded knockdowns with Sánchez but he lost the 8-round bout by unanimous decision.

Campeón Azteca
Later that year, Estrada participated in the boxing reality show Campeón Azteca: Round 3 that took place between September to December 2011 in Tuxtla Gutiérrez. The show featured 16 super flyweight fighters competing in an elimination tournament. Estrada won his first fight by unanimous decision (60-54, 60–54, 60–54) against fellow prospect Ivan Diaz. In his second fight in the tournament, Estrada stopped veteran Juan Carlos Tirado in the second round. Estrada won one more fight against Luis May to qualify to the competition's final.

In the competition's final bout, Estrada would face Sánchez Jr. once again. Estrada went down in the second round after a left straight from Sánchez. Later on, with both fighters trading punches in the final round, Sánchez was rocked by a left hook from Estrada. Estrada continued throwing combinations and eventually scored a knockdown over Sánchez. Sánchez attempted to get up but the referee waived the count, giving Estrada the win by TKO with 1:02 elapsed in the tenth and final round. Both Estrada and Sánchez would go on to become world champions.

Estrada vs. González
On November 17, 2012, Estrada moved down from his natural division to challenge WBA light flyweight champion Román González. This was Estrada's first fight outside his native Mexico. He lost a unanimous decision (112-116, 112–116, 110–118) to González, the future number one ranked pound-for-pound fighter. González would later say that he was interested in a rematch against Estrada after one of his successful flyweight world title defenses.

Unified flyweight champion

Estrada vs. Viloria
On April 6, 2013, Estrada once again challenged for a world title, fighting Brian Viloria at the Cotai Arena in Macau, China, for the WBA (Super) and WBO Flyweight titles. Viloria had unified his titles against Hernán Márquez on the same event in which Gónzalez defeated Estrada. Estrada appeared to lose the early rounds against Viloria, but he would surge on the latter rounds, landing combinations that gave him the edge. Estrada won by split decision (117-111, 116–111, 113–115), thus becoming the new unified champion. Although, observers of the fight felt that the victory should have been ruled a unanimous decision in favor of Estrada.

Various defenses
In his first defense, he defeated number one ranked challenger and future champion Milan Melindo by unanimous decision (118-109, 118–109, 117–109). Melindo was knocked down in round 11, as Estrada cruised to a shutout win. Estrada would fight three times in 2014, scoring victories over Richie Mepranum, former champion Giovani Segura, and Jobert Alvarez in a non-title fight. In 2015, he added two additional title defenses, against Rommel Asenjo and former champion Hernán Márquez. He then took a break from boxing to undergo surgery on his right hand. During Estrada's reign as a flyweight champion he became known for his refined technique and accurate punching.

Super flyweight
Following 3 and a half years as unified flyweight champion and five titles defenses, Estrada vacated his titles in September 2016 to campaign in the super flyweight division. Estrada said that he could no longer make the flyweight 112 lbs limit. After spending a year away from the ring, Estrada came back against gatekeeper Raymond Tabugon in October 2016 in his native Puerto Peñasco. Estrada won an easy unanimous decision (100-90, 100–90, 100–90).

Estrada vs. Cuadras
In June 2017, it was revealed that Estrada would face Carlos Cuadras. Following Srisaket Sor Rungvisai's unanimous decision win over Román González, Cuadras was the mandatory challenger for Sor Rungvisai, the World Boxing Council's champion. However, the WBC ordered a rematch between Sor Rungvisai and González in light of the controversy around the González-Sor Rungvisai decision. Cuadras then had to face Estrada, the next available ranked contender. The fight was scheduled for the Sor Rungvisai-González undercard on September 9, 2017, at Carson's StubHub Center.

On fight night, Cuadras seemed to gain the upper hand in the early rounds, switch-hitting and throwing and landing more punches. Nevertheless, Estrada was able to slowly impose his methodical style in the second half of the fight, even dropping Cuadras in round 11. Michael Buffer incorrectly announced "Carlos Estrada" as the winner of the fight, but after some confusion he corrected his mistake, giving Juan Francisco Estrada the win by unanimous decision (114-113, 114–113, 114–113).

Estrada vs Sor Rungvisai 
On February, 2018, Estrada who was ranked #1 by the WBC at super flyweight, challenged Srisaket Sor Rungvisai for the WBC and The Ring super flyweight titles. Estrada boxed well at times, and managed to connect multiple times on Rungvisai, who was able to take Estrada's best shots. Estrada too, was getting hit often by Rungvisai, but was able to take the champion's power. In the twelfth round, Estrada, perhaps sensing he is need of a knockout to win, fought aggressively. In the end, it was not enough, as Estrada fell short of winning his first world title at super flyweight, as two of the judges saw Rungvisai as the winner, scoring it 117-111 and 115–113, and one judge had the fight a draw, 114-114.

Estrada vs Orucuta 
In his next fight, Estrada, ranked #1 by the WBC, fought #7 ranked Felipe Orucuta. Estrada came out with a unanimous decision victory, 118–110, 117-111 and 117–111 on the scorecards, however, the contest was tougher for Estrada than what was expected by fans and media alike.

Estrada vs Mendez 
On December 8, 2018, Estrada stepped in on short notice and fought Victor Mendez at super bantamweight. The fight ended up being a good stay-busy fight for Estrada, as he dominated every second of the fight. After seven rounds, Mendez had had enough of it, and the fight was officially stopped.

Estrada vs Gonzalez II 
On the 13th of March, 2021, Estrada faced WBA (Super) super flyweight champion, Román González in a highly anticipated rematch. This was the second time the pair had met. Their first fight in 2012 ended in a unanimous decision win for Gonzalez. Both fighters were throwing a lot of punches, with Compubox crediting both with 2529 thrown punches combined, making it the busiest fight at 115 pounds the company has ever tracked. In a very close and thrilling fight, Gonzalez seemed to have narrowly outlanded Estrada. However, Estrada earned the split-decision victory having two judges score the fight in his favor, 117-111 and 115–113, while the third judge had it 115-113 for Gonzalez.

The Gonzalez trilogy 
Gonzalez was expected to face Juan Francisco Estrada in a trilogy bout in the main event of a DAZN broadcast card on 5 March 2022, at Pechanga Arena in San Diego, California. Estrada was forced to withdraw from the fight due to a positive COVID-19 test. On 3 September 2022, it was announced that Gonzalez would face Juan Francisco Estrada for the third time in his professional career on 3 December. The bout headlined a DAZN broadcast card, which took place at the Desert Diamond Arena in Glendale, Arizona. Gonzalez lost the fight by majority decision, with scores of 114–114. 115–113 and 116–112.

Professional boxing record

See also
List of Mexican boxing world champions
List of flyweight boxing champions
List of super-flyweight boxing champions

References

External links

Juan Francisco Estrada - Profile, News Archive & Current Rankings at Box.Live

1990 births
Living people
Boxers from Sonora
People from Puerto Peñasco
Mexican male boxers
Light-flyweight boxers
Flyweight boxers
Super-flyweight boxers
World flyweight boxing champions
World super-flyweight boxing champions
World Boxing Association champions
World Boxing Organization champions
World Boxing Council champions
The Ring (magazine) champions